{|

{{Infobox ship career
|Hide header=
|Ship name=*Naruto Maru (1969–96)
Kurushima I (1996)Citra Mandala Satria (1996–2004)Senopati Nusantara (2004–06)
|Ship owner=
|Ship operator=
|Ship registry=* (1969–96)
 (1996–2006)
|Ship route=
|Ship ordered=
|Ship builder=Taguma Shipbuilding
|Ship original cost=
|Ship yard number=
|Ship way number=
|Ship laid down=
|Ship launched=
|Ship completed=December 1969
|Ship christened=
|Ship acquired=
|Ship maiden voyage=
|Ship in service=
|Ship out of service=30 December 2006
|Ship identification=
|Ship fate=Foundered 30 December 2006
|Ship notes=
}}

|}

The MV Senopati Nusantara was an Indonesian ferry that sank in a storm on December 30, 2006. The Japanese-made ship was a scheduled passenger liner from the port of Kumai in Central Kalimantan (Borneo) to Tanjung Emas port in Semarang, Central Java. At least 400–500 people are thought to have drowned.

Initial reports claimed as many as 800 were on board, although this was later lowered to around 628, including 57 crew. Design capacity was 1,300 passengers.

Description
The ship was a ro-ro passenger ferry.

History
The vessel was built in 1969 by Taguma Shipbuilding, Onomichi, Japan as Naruto Maru. The IMO Number 6926866 was allocated. It was renamed Kurushima I in July 1996 and then Citra Mandala Satria in August 1996 and finally, Senopati Nusantara in January 2004.

 Sinking 

The Senopati Nusantara was on scheduled time to bring passengers and vehicles across the Java Sea from Borneo to Java. According to the manifest, the ship was carrying 628 people including 57 crew, but later press releases from government officials gave an inconsistent number of total passengers. The ship had a license to carry 850 passengers.

Initially, stormy weather was suggested to be the main cause of the disaster. Local officials of the Meteorology and Geophysics Agency (BMG), however, did not ban the vessel from sailing, and the official at the Kumai port issued a sailing permit based on the weather report. According to one survivor's account, the ship rolled over and part of the hull was sticking out the water before it submerged into the sea.

 Ship's condition
The Indonesian Transport Minister, Hatta Rajasa, said that the ship was not old and was still seaworthy. He said that the ship was built in 1990 and underwent repairs in 2006. It was equipped with sufficient safety gear. He said that the ship was carrying 542 passengers, 57 crew members, 29 bus/truck drivers and conductors as well as their respective vehicles during its last journey.

 Survivors 

Immediate rescue efforts were made by local fishermen and rescue workers, and the Indonesian Navy sent six warships, one CASA plane, one Bell helicopter, two speedboats, one Nomad plane, one C-130 Hercules, one CN-235 airplane and two Bolco helicopters to assist in the search for survivors. At least 177 survivors were rescued within the first 24 hours, but strong winds and sea currents hampered rescue efforts. Rescue workers in helicopters faced difficulties in distinguishing survivors from the sea foam created by high waves, and the survivors who had made it onto life rafts found it difficult to stay afloat in the stormy waters. The search and rescue team widened the search radius by hundreds of kilometers, but only a few more survivors were found in the following days, some of which were located by chance.

They had been adrift on life rafts for days without food; some did not survive and their bodies had to be thrown into the water. The survivors were taken immediately to a hospital in Surabaya. Other survivors witnessed dozens of bodies floating in the sea. They were first thought to be survivors of Adam Air Flight 574 that crashed two days after in another storm, until it later turned out they were from MV Senopati Nusantara.''

On January 5, 2007, fifteen victims were found stranded on Kangean Island. The fourteen survivors, who survived for ten days by drinking rainwater and eating food supplies stored in the life raft, were then taken to Makassar, South Sulawesi.

See also
 Adam Air Flight 574, a Boeing 737 aircraft which crashed on January 1, 2007, in the same storm.

References 

1969 ships
Ships built in Japan
Ferries of Japan
Merchant ships of Japan
Ferries of Indonesia
Merchant ships of Indonesia
Maritime incidents in 2006
Maritime incidents in Indonesia